Brendon Lucas da Silva Estevam, known as Brendon (born 29 May 1995) is a Brazilian football player who plays as a centre-back for Liga I club FC Argeș Pitești.

Club career
He made his professional debut in the Segunda Liga for Portimonense on 28 January 2017 in a game against União da Madeira.

In June 2017, Brendon joined Académica.

Honours

Portimonense
LigaPro: 2016–17

References

External links

1995 births
Living people
Brazilian footballers
Sportspeople from Federal District (Brazil)
Footballers from Brasília
Brazilian expatriate footballers
Association football defenders
Anápolis Futebol Clube players
Grêmio Esportivo Anápolis players
Portimonense S.C. players
Associação Académica de Coimbra – O.A.F. players
S.C. Covilhã players
Leixões S.C. players
V.League 1 players
Ho Chi Minh City FC players
Liga Portugal 2 players
Liga I players
FC Argeș Pitești players
Brazilian expatriate sportspeople in Portugal
Expatriate footballers in Portugal
Brazilian expatriate sportspeople in Vietnam
Expatriate footballers in Vietnam
Brazilian expatriate sportspeople in Romania
Expatriate footballers in Romania